Modern Quantum Mechanics, often called Sakurai or Sakurai and Napolitano, is a standard graduate-level quantum mechanics textbook written originally by J. J. Sakurai and edited by San Fu Tuan in 1985, with later editions coauthored by Jim Napolitano. Sakurai died in 1982 before he could finish the textbook and both the first edition of the book, published in 1985 by Benjamin Cummings, and the revised edition of 1994, published by Addison-Wesley, were edited and completed by Tuan posthumously. The book was updated by Napolitano and released two later editions. The second edition was initially published by Addison-Wesley in 2010 and rereleased as an eBook by Cambridge University Press, who released a third edition in 2020.

Table of Contents (3rd edition)
 Prefaces
 Chapter 1: Fundamental Concepts
 Chapter 2: Quantum Dynamics
 Chapter 3: Theory of Angular Momentum
 Chapter 4: Symmetry in Quantum Mechanics
 Chapter 5: Approximation Methods
 Chapter 6: Scattering Theory
 Chapter 7: Identical Particles
 Chapter 8: Relativistic Quantum Mechanics
 Appendix A: Electromagnetic Units
 Appendix B: Elementary Solutions to Schrödinger's Wave Equation
 Appendix C: Hamiltonian for a Charge in an Electromagnetic Field
 Appendix D: Proof of the Angular-Momentum Rule (3.358)
 Appendix E: Finding Clebsch-Gordan Coefficients
 Appendix F: Notes on Complex Variables
 Bibliography
 Index

Reception 
Early editions of the book have received several reviews. It is a standard textbook on the subject and is recommended in other works on the subject, it has inspired other textbooks on the subject, and it is used as a point of comparison in book reviews. Along with Griffith's Introduction to Quantum Mechanics, the book was also analyzed in a review of the "Philosophical Standpoints of Textbooks in Quantum Mechanics" in June 2020.

Publication history 
 
  (hardcover)
  (hardcover)
  (eBook)
  (hardcover)
  (eBook)

See also 

 Introduction to Quantum Mechanics, an undergraduate text by David J. Griffiths
 List of textbooks on classical mechanics and quantum mechanics

References

External links 
 Publisher's website for the 2nd edition
 Publisher's website for the 3rd edition
 Book in the Internet Archive

Physics textbooks
1985 non-fiction books
1994 non-fiction books
2020 non-fiction books
Quantum mechanics